Heartbeats – Chris Rea's Greatest Hits is a 2005 compilation album by British singer-songwriter Chris Rea. It reached #24 position in UK Albums Chart, and was certified Silver by BPI in 2006.

Track listing
 "On the Beach" (Edit) - 3:43
 "Fool (If You Think It's Over)" - 4:03
 "Auberge" - 4:41
 "Let's Dance" - 4:14
 "Stainsby Girls" - 4:05
 "Nothing to Fear" (Edit) -  4:27
 "Tell Me There's a Heaven" - 6:01
 "Josephine" (Edit) - 4:29
 "I Can Hear Your Heartbeat" - 3:21
 "The Road to Hell (Part 2)" - 4:26
 "Winter Song" - 4:29
 "God's Great Banana Skin" - 4:14
 "You Can Go Your Own Way" - 3:54
 "Julia" - 3:54
 "Looking for the Summer" - 4:57
 "Gone Fishing" - 4:41

Certifications

References

2005 greatest hits albums
Chris Rea compilation albums
Magnet Records compilation albums